The Scotsman is an automobile series that was produced by the Studebaker Packard Corporation of South Bend, Indiana, during model years 1957 and 1958, and  a low-priced series of pickup trucks in 1958 and 1959. The name was based on the reputation of Scottish frugality, the cars being built for function and minimalism.

Car and wagon
When Studebaker-Packard's financial situation worsened in 1955 and 1956, company leaders decided, rather than meet the "Big Three" automakers head-on, to compete with low-priced, basic transportation. Using the Studebaker Champion's two- and four-door sedan and two-door station-wagon bodies, the company created a vehicle which could undercut the prices of minimal-frill competitors the Chevrolet 150, Ford Custom and Plymouth Plaza.  The Scotsman had features reminiscent of the "blackout" cars of the shortened 1942 model year, from which chrome trim was eliminated by war-materials rationing, though such refinements have been added by latter-day enthusiasts.

Hubcaps and grille were painted; buyers paid extra for a basic recirculating heater for the passenger compartment. Interiors were fitted with painted cardboard panels—gray vinyl being the single standard for upholstery. Rubberized floor coverings replaced carpeting. The only chrome plating was on the front and rear bumpers and some minor interior parts. Painted bumpers were an option to reduce the cost of the car even further. On two-door models, the rear windows were fixed without winders. Standard windshield wipers were vacuum-powered, resulting in reduced performance as engine load increased. The only apparent frill was Studebaker's heavily promoted "Cyclops Eye" speedometer, the same as that used on the 1956 Studebakers. Dealers were instructed to avoid installing extra-cost accessories, on the rationale that a buyer who wanted frills on an economical car could buy a regular Champion for an extra $200 (equal to $ today).

Priced below the competition from $1,776 (equal to $ today) for the two-door sedan, Scotsman sales were projected at 4,000 cars for the short 1957 model year. In fact, over 9,000 were sold—not only to frugal or low-budget customers but also to wealthy notables such as former First Lady Eleanor Roosevelt. For, despite its austerity, the Scotsman delivered exceptional value and economy. The small six-cylinder engine delivered a claimed  of gasoline when the overdrive transmission was chosen. This was unheard-of mileage for a car of its size in 1957, although it came at a price: With only , the Scotsman was by no means a rip-roaring performer. It took about 20 seconds to reach  from rest, at a time when sub-10-second 0-60 mph times were becoming more common, even among the low-priced field. However, it appears that few complained about poor performance in the early days of the Interstate highway.

Following up on the initial success of the first Scotsman, the 1958 models were changed little. An ever-so-slightly altered grille and round taillamp lenses were adopted, which allowed the company to keep prices as inexpensive as possible. Although the 1958 Champion received added-on tailfins in the back and fender-mounted pods up front to accept four headlamps (two per side) as was the trend in '58, the Scotsman remained finless in the rear and kept the old dual headlamp system. Promotional materials now referred to the "Studebaker Scotsman" rather than "Studebaker Champion Scotsman", a promotion of sorts from a sub-series to a model in its own right.

In a push to increase fleet sales, Studebaker also offered the Econ-o-miler in 1958, based on the body of the  wheelbase President sedan. The Econ-o-miler used the Scotsman's frugal exterior and interior elements and was pushed as a taxi model. In addition, Studebaker's police-package cars in 1958 were often Scotsmans with Commander and President V-8 engines.

The Scotsman, which got off to a great start for '57, continued its success in 1958, outselling the Champion, Commander and President lines combined. The Scotsman proved that Studebaker need not attempt to follow the styling trends of the rest of the industry. Building on the Scotsman's clean-lined look, Studebaker engineers and designers quickly and cheaply created a new compact car for 1959, the Lark, not as austere as the Scotsman, but able to seat six adults in a package markedly different from its competitors at the time.

Pickup truck
To serve a target market for a low-priced, basic pickup truck, Studebaker produced a Scotsman truck based on the lines of the 1949-53 style of grille and front-end sheetmetal, with a few modifications. Most trucks in the 1950s had as standard one tail-lamp, one interior sun visor, one windshield wiper, and one arm-rest—all on the driver's side. The Scotsman followed this philosophy with one exception: there was no arm-rest. Externally, the Scotsman had simple plaid decals and no chrome trim.

Stripping to a more basic level allowed Studebaker to advertise the lowest-priced pickup in the U.S. in 1958; it cost less than $1,500 to drive home a standard Scotsman pickup. The model sold reasonably well, though the general car and truck market was down in 1958.

The Scotsman truck, unlike the car, was continued in 1959, exchanging its plaid decal nameplates for chromed "S" and "Studebaker" emblems. An inexpensive "Deluxe Equipment Group" enabled buyers to fit their Scotsmans with the same grille and front sheetmetal as the regular Studebaker trucks. Two new models were added as well, although these were comprised simply of additional engines from which to choose. More pickups were sold than the standard "Deluxe" line.

The Scotsman was replaced for the 1960 model year by the Studebaker Champ pickup, which was based on the same truck chassis but with a cab derived from the contemporary Lark four-door sedan.

References

Further reading
The Standard Catalogue of American Cars 1946-1975, John Gunnell, Editor. Kraus Publications, 1987. 
Studebaker Cars James H. Moloney.  Crestline Books, 1994. 
Studebaker, The Postwar Years Richard Langworth. Motorbooks International, 1979. 

Scotsman
Coupés
Pickup trucks
Cars introduced in 1958